Awka South'' Local Government Area (LGA) is made up of nine towns, namely, Amawbia, Awka, Ezinato, Isiagu, Mbaukwu, Nibo, Nise, Okpuno and Umuawulu. There are three major streets that span this area, which are the Zik Avenue, Works Road and Arthur Eze Avenue. In the past, the people of Awka South LGA were well known for blacksmithing. Today they are respected among the Igbo people of Nigeria for their technical and business skills.Awka is a town in Awka south local government area. It is the seat of government and has a lot of prominent people both home and abroad. While Amawbia is home to the state house i.e. Governor's lodge and the State Prisons. Nise has notable infrastructures like WAEC (West African examination council) state head office and St. Paul University college situated there.

Isiagu community is a town in Awka south local government area. It is one of the agricultural areas in the state with rich fertile soil for farming. It is believed to be one of the ancient towns in south eastern Nigeria (igbo land).

Isiagu community have had two traditional rulers till date. The current traditional ruler is Igwe Augustine Nwankwo (igwe agu 1 of Isiagu).

Isiagu has two primary schools and one secondary school. The community has a history of peaceful coinhibition and strong cultural heritage,Isiagu till today still maintains its culture and traditions.

Schools

Awka south local Government area is the location of Nnamdi Azikiwe University

Here is the list of secondary schools in Awka South Local Government Area:
 Bishop Crowther Seminary, Awka
 Igwebuike Grammar Secondary School, Awka
 St. John of God School, Awka
 Girls Secondary School, Awka
 Community Secondary School, Umuokpu
 Capital City Secondary School, Awka
 Kenneth Dike Memorial Secondary School, Awka
 Ezi-Awka Community Secondary School, Awka
 Community Secondary School, Okpuno
 Nneoma * Community Secondary School, Nibo
 Community Secondary School, Mbaukwu
 Emeka Aghasili High School, Nise
 Community Secondary School, Agulu-Awka
 Community Secondary School, Amawbia
 Union Secondary School, Umuawulu
 Union Secondary School, Amawbia
 Ezike High School, Nibo
 Holy Cross High School, Umuawulu Mbaukwu
 Community Secondary School, Isiagu
 Krosa Model Schools, Amawbia
Nnamdi Azikiwe UniversityNibo''' is a town in Awka South, Anambra State, Nigeria. Its geographical coordinates are 6° 10' 0" North, 7° 4' 0" East.

climate

References

Local Government Areas in Anambra State dated July 21, 2007; accessed October 4, 2007

Local Government Areas in Anambra State
Local Government Areas in Igboland